The Ministry of Overseas, Ministry of Overseas Affairs, Ministry of Overseas Territories (Spanish Ministerio de Ultramar), or simply, Ultramar, was the ministerial department in charge of the direction of Spanish territories between 1863 and 1899. It administered the Philippines, Cuba, Puerto Rico and the Carolinas, Marianas and Palaos.

Prior to its establishment, the administration of the colonies was in charge of the Ministry of the Navy. By a royal decree of 20 May 1863 responsibility for the colonies was transferred to a new department. Following Spanish–American War of 1898, in which Spain lost the greater part of her colonial territory (Cuba, Guam, Puerto Rico and the Philippines), and the sale of her remaining Pacific possessions to Germany by the treaty of 12 February 1899, the Overseas Ministry itself was suppressed in a royal decree of 20 April 1899.

The creation of a Spanish protectorate in Morocco in 1912, and the establishment of Spanish control over its Guinean possessions, a new colonial department, the Direccion General de Marruecos y Colonias (Directorate-General for Morocco and the Colonies), was set up in 1925. After recognizing the independence of Morocco in 1956, its name was changed to Direccion General de Plazas y Provincias Africanas (Directorate-General for African Territories and Provinces). In 1969, following the independence of Equatorial Guinea, its remit was once again reduced and it became the Direccion General de Promoción del Sahara (Directorate-General for Sahara Promotion), charged with the advancement of Spanish Sahara until 1975.

List of Ministers

References

Defunct departments of the Spanish Government